Hammanopyge is a genus of trilobites in the order Phacopida (family Cheiruridae), that existed during the upper Ordovician in what is now Scotland. It was described by Pribyl and Vanek in 1985, and the type species is Hammanopyge unica, which was originally described under the genus Acidaspis by Thomson in 1857. The type locality was the Balclatchie Formation.

References

External links
 Hammanopyge at the Paleobiology Database

Cheiruridae
Phacopida genera
Fossil taxa described in 1985
Ordovician trilobites
Fossils of Great Britain